Unione Sportiva Dilettantistica Zagarolo was an Italian association football club located in Zagarolo, Lazio.

History 
The club was founded in 1968.

In the summer 2012, after the relegation to Eccellenza Lazio, the club was dissolved.

Phoenix club
In 2012, to continue the football history of the town, Promozione Lazio club, A.S.D. Real Torbellamonaca 1970, of the  frazione of Rome, was renamed to A.S.D. Real T.B.M. Zagarolo.

In mid-2013, after the promotion, the side transferred the seat and its sports title of Eccellenza Lazio to the city of Frascati, becoming A.S.D. Lupa Castelli Romani. Because of this transaction, Real TBM Zagarolo has effectively disappeared from the Italian football panorama.

Colors and badge 
Its colors were all dark red.

References

Defunct football clubs in Italy
Defunct football clubs in Lazio
Association football clubs established in 1968
Association football clubs disestablished in 2012
1968 establishments in Italy
2012 disestablishments in Italy
Sport in the Metropolitan City of Rome Capital